MASD may refer to:

 Pennsylvania
 Mahanoy Area School District, Schuylkill County
 McKeesport Area School District, McKeesport
 Meyersdale Area School District, Somerset County
 Mifflinburg Area School District, Union County
 Millersburg Area School District, Dauphin County
 Millville Area School District, Columbia County
 Milton Area School District, Milton
 Minersville Area School District, Schuylkill County
 Mohawk Area School District, Bessemer, Lawrence County
 Montgomery Area School District, Lycoming County
 Montoursville Area School District, Lycoming County
 Montrose Area School District, Susquehanna County
 Washington State
 Mount Adams School District, Yakima County